Sami Hilmy al-Hinnawi (1898 – 31 October 1950) was a Syrian politician and military officer.

Life

On December 19, 1949, Shishakli carried out a coup d'état (the third that year), strengthening his dictatorship. On October 31, 1950, al-Hinnawi was murdered in Beirut, Lebanon, by Hersho al-Barazi, a cousin of Muhsin al-Barazi, the Prime Minister who was overthrown and killed in Hinnawi's coup.

References

Further reading

1898 births
1950 deaths
Chiefs of Staff of the Syrian Army
Politicians from Beirut
Syrian people murdered abroad
Syrian Social Nationalist Party politicians